Potsdam-Rehbrücke station is a railway station in the Bergholz-Rehbrücke district of the municipality Nuthetal located in the district of Potsdam-Mittelmark, Brandenburg, Germany.

References

Railway stations in Brandenburg
Buildings and structures in Potsdam-Mittelmark